Western Bolivian Guarani, known locally as Simba and Simba Guarani, is a Guarani language spoken in Bolivia, in the Chuquisaca Department north of the Pilcomayo River.

Western Bolivian Guarani is one of a number of "Guarani dialects" considered distinct languages by Ethnologue: Chiripá, Eastern Bolivian Guarani, Mbyá Guarani, Aché, Kaiwá, Xetá, and Paraguayan Guaraní. Of these, Paraguayan Guaraní is by far the most widely spoken variety and it is often referred to simply as Guaraní.

References 

Languages of Bolivia
Guarani languages
Chaco linguistic area